The 1947–48 Clarkson Golden Knights men's ice hockey season was the 26th season of play for the program but first under the oversight of the NCAA. The Golden Knights represented the Clarkson College of Technology and were coached by Jack Roos, in his 17th season.

Season
Entering the season, coach Roos had few returning players and had to rely on an influx of freshmen to help fill out the team. The result was that the team wasn't quite as cohesive as the squads that Roos had put together in the past but the Golden Knights still showed that they could compete at the same level as other top programs. After sweeping a series against Carleton, Tech jumped right into the fire with a game versus Dartmouth at Watertown, New York. The knights did well to limit one of the top offensive teams to just two goals but they were only able to get a single marker themselves. Clarkson then began a road trip with an overpowering performance against Champlain but couldn't quite pull out a victory over either Princeton or Yale.

Once they returned home, Clarkson appeared to be a bit tired from their junket and were soundly beaten by Colgate. After the worst performance of the season, Tech rallied to defeat nearby rival St. Lawrence before romping to two shutout wins over rather weak opponents. The rematch with Dartmouth ended with the same result as the first game, leaving little doubt that the Indians were the better team. Afterwards, Tech was able to defeat two more Canadian schools, but ended the year losing to a much improved Army squad.

The revamped lineup had shown some progress throughout the year but there was still room for improvement from the Knights. Unfortunately, coach Roos would not be around to lead the team; he retired from his position following the season after 19 years with the school.

Charles Hyde and Martin Gabey served as team managers.

Roster

Standings

Schedule and results

|-
!colspan=12 style=";" | Regular Season

† It's unclear if this is a team from Champlain College or the town of Champlain.‡ Contemporary reports have the score of the game 4–3 in Clarkson's favor.

References

Clarkson Golden Knights men's ice hockey seasons
Clarkson
Clarkson
Clarkson